Come the Day  is the fifth studio album by Australian group the Seekers. The album was released in 1966. In North America, the album was titled Georgy Girl. The album peaked at number 2 in the Billboard albums chart and number 3 in the United Kingdom and number 7 in Australia.

Reception
Bruce Eder from AllMusic said: "It was on this album that all of The Seekers' varied attributes... kicked in at their peak at the same time. The album opens with the title track, a Woodley original that's one of the best folk-style recordings to come out of the British Invasion and also one of the Seekers' greatest performances."

Track listing
Side A
 "Come the Day" (Bruce Woodley)
 "Island of Dreams" (Tom Springfield)
 "The Last Thing on My Mind" (Tom Paxton)
 "All Over The World (Dans Le Monde En Entier)" (Françoise Hardy, Julian More)
 "Red Rubber Ball" (Paul Simon, Bruce Woodley)
 "Well, Well, Well" (Bob Gibson, Bob Camp)

Side B
 "Georgy Girl" (Jim Dale, Tom Springfield) 
 "Yesterday" (John Lennon, Paul McCartney) 
 "I Wish You Could Be Here" (Paul Simon, Bruce Woodley)  
 "Turn, Turn, Turn" (Pete Seeger)
 "Louisiana Man" (Doug Kershaw)
 "California Dreamin'" (John Phillips, Michelle Phillips)

Charts

Weekly charts

Year-end charts

References

External links

The Seekers albums
Columbia Records albums
1966 albums